The tenth and final season of the American television comedy series The Goldbergs premiered on September 21, 2022.

Cast

Main cast
Wendi McLendon-Covey as Beverly Goldberg
Sean Giambrone as Adam Goldberg
Troy Gentile as Barry Goldberg
Hayley Orrantia as Erica Goldberg
Sam Lerner as Geoff Schwartz

Recurring cast
Judd Hirsch as Ben "Pop-Pop" Goldberg
Tim Meadows as Jon Glascott
Ken Lerner as Lou Schwartz
Mindy Sterling as Linda Schwartz
Beth Triffon as Joanne Schwartz
Jennifer Irwin as Virginia "Ginzy" Kremp
Stephanie Courtney as Essie Karp
Noah Munck as "Naked Rob" Smith
Matt Bush as Andy Cogan
Shayne Topp as Matt Bradley
Isabella Gomez as Carmen

Guest cast
Sadie Stanley as Brea Bee
Dan Fogler as Marvin Goldberg
Kenny Ridwan as Dave Kim
Sean Marquette as Johnny Atkins
Alex Jennings as Carla Mann
Erinn Hayes as Jane Bales
Kimiko Glenn as Lauren
AJ Michalka as Lainey Lewis
David Koechner as Bill Lewis

Episodes

Ratings

References

The Goldbergs (2013 TV series) seasons
2022 American television seasons